Abdelrahman Mohamed El-Sayed (born May 19, 1989) is an Egyptian weightlifter. El-Sayed represented Egypt at the 2008 Summer Olympics in Beijing, where he competed for the men's heavyweight category (105 kg). El-Sayed placed fourteenth in this event, as he successfully lifted 175 kg in the single-motion snatch, and hoisted 210 kg in the two-part, shoulder-to-overhead clean and jerk, for a total of 385 kg. El-Sayed was later elevated to a higher position, when Ukraine's Ihor Razoronov had been disqualified from the Olympics, after he tested positive for nandrolone.

Major results

References

External links
NBC Olympics Profile

1989 births
Living people
Egyptian male weightlifters
Olympic weightlifters of Egypt
Weightlifters at the 2008 Summer Olympics
African Games gold medalists for Egypt
African Games medalists in weightlifting
Competitors at the 2007 All-Africa Games
21st-century Egyptian people